The men's 4 x 100 metres relay event at the 2006 Commonwealth Games was held on March 24–25.

Medalists

Results

Heats
Qualification: First 2 teams of each heat (Q) plus the next 2 fastest (q) qualified for the final.

Final

References
Results

Relay
2006